Duchess of Rutland (or Dutchess of Rutland) was launched in 1786 in Dublin. She carried passengers between England and Ireland. In 1793 she apparently transferred to Liverpool and sailed from there as a West Indiaman. She was on a voyage to Barbados when a French privateer captured her in 1797.

Career
Duchess of Rutland first appeared in Lloyd's Register (LR) in 1789. She appears to have carried passengers between England and Ireland, with her owners being a group of Holyhead packet captains.

Duchess of Rutland was last listed in LR in 1793. Dutchess of Rugland apparently had been sold to owners in Liverpool, who had her lengthened. She appeared in the Register of Shipping in 1800. It showed her master as T. Keen, owner J.Jackson, and trading out of Liverpool. However, this represented stale data as Duchess of Rutland had been captured several years earlier.

Fate
Duchess of Rutland, Keen, master, was sailing from Liverpool to Barbados when in late 1797 she encountered the French privateer Vengeance, a cutter  of 20 guns and 200 men.

Notes

Citations

References
 
 

1786 ships
Ships built in Ireland
Age of Sail merchant ships of England
Captured ships